Recorded and released between Viva Dead Ponies and Valhalla Avenue, the Bertie's Brochures mini-album found The Fatima Mansions displaying their more subtle side, with the record being dominated with slower, piano-led ballads such as the title track and their cover of Scott Walker's "Long About Now", although their radically altered take on REM's "Shiny Happy People" and "Mario Vargas Yoni" represented the band's noisier and more scathing side too.

The EP was primarily a way of showcasing the songs "Behind The Moon" and "Bertie's Brochures" which had been played since The Fatima Mansions' earliest gigs in 1989, but had not fit in with either of their albums at this point.

Track listing 
All tracks composed by Cathal Coughlan; except where indicated
 "Behind The Moon" (3:47)
 "Bertie's Brochures" (5:15)
 "Shiny Happy People" (Bill Berry, Michael Stipe, Mike Mills, Peter Buck) - (3:17)
 "VN (Apology)" (1:21)
 "Mario Vargas Yoni" (2:30)
 "Smiling" (3:05)
 "Long About Now" (Scott Engel) - (1:53)
 "The Great Valerio" (Richard Thompson) - (4:26)

Personnel
The Fatima Mansions
Cathal Coughlan
Andrías Ó Grúama
Hugh Bunker
Nick Allum
Nick Bagnall
Technical
Victor Van Vugt - engineer
Lawrence Bogle - cover illustration 

1991 albums
The Fatima Mansions albums